Hsingan (or Xing'an) refers to a former province, which once occupied western Heilongjiang and part of northwest Jilin provinces of China. The name is related to that of the Greater Khingan Mountains. Another name used for this land was Barga, which is also the name used for the western part of the province, the Barga district.

Administration
The capital of Hsingan was the town of Hailar (or Hulun), on the China Eastern Railway line near the Russian border. Hsingan was divided into various sub-prefectures, similar in form to other Manchukuo provinces. The second city of importance was Manzhouli.

History 

Hsingan province was first created in 1932 as an administrative sub-division of the Japanese-controlled Empire of Manchukuo. From 1939 to 1943, the province was divided into four parts, labeled Hsingan North, Hsingan East, Hsingan South and Hsingan West. These four provinces were reunited into a Xing'an Consolidated Province (興安総省) in 1943. Hsingan at  encompassed nearly one third of the land area of Manchukuo.

The population of Hsingan, estimated at 965,000 in 1935, was predominantly ethnically Mongol, and Hsingan was therefore administered by a local Mongol prince (under supervision of a Japanese resident supervisor).

Hsingan was the site of a number of clashes in the Soviet-Japanese Border Wars, most notably the Nomonhan Incident where Japanese Kwantung Army and Manchukuo Imperial Army forces were defeated by the Soviet Red Army in 1939.

After the annexation of Manchukuo by the Republic of China after the end of World War II, the Kuomintang continued to recognize the area as Hsingan Province, with the capital in Hailar. However, under the administration of the People's Republic of China from 1949, the area was annexed to the Inner Mongolia Autonomous Region, and is now referred to as the Hulunbuir Prefecture-level city. The population is now estimated to be over 80% ethnic Han Chinese.

Economy
Under the Manchukuo period, Hsingan was primarily an agricultural area, with food grains, particularly wheat, soy and corn, as well as cattle, sheep, horse and other livestock. The primary economic asset of Hsingan was its extensive coal deposits, primarily at Chalai Nor hill, 25 kilometers from the frontier station of Manchouli, where 290,000 metric tonnes were extracted annually. Hsingan was also a trade zone between Manchukuo, the Soviet Union, and Soviet-dominated Mongolia.

See also

Hinggan League

References
The Mongols of Manchuria: Their Tribal Divisions, Geographical Distribution, Historical Relations with Manchus and Chinese, and Present Political Problems. by Owen Lattimore　Pacific Affairs, Vol. 8, No. 3 (Sep., 1935), pp. 367–371

External links 
Map of Eastern Xingan province of Manchukuo
Map of Western Xingan province of Manchukuo
Map of Northern Xingan province of Manchukuo
Map of Southern Xingan province of Manchukuo

Provinces of the Republic of China (1912–1949)
Geography of Inner Mongolia
History of Inner Mongolia
Subdivisions of Manchukuo